Brist is a village in southern Dalmatia, Croatia, population 400 (census 2011). Located on the Adriatic coast between Makarska and Ploče, with a tradition of fishing, and wine and olive growing, the village is oriented towards tourism in recent decades.

References 

Populated places in Split-Dalmatia County
Populated coastal places in Croatia